The Seattle Mariners are a Major League Baseball (MLB) team who have participated in 46 seasons since their inception in 1977. Through July 16, 2022, they have played 7,156 games, winning 3,385, losing 3,769, and tying two, for a winning percentage of .473. This list documents the superlative records and accomplishments of team members during their tenures as Seattle Mariners in Major League Baseball's American League West.

Ichiro Suzuki holds the most franchise records as of the end of the 2012 season, with ten, including best single-season batting average, most career hits, and most career triples. He is followed by Edgar Martínez, who holds nine records, including best career on-base percentage and the single-season walk record.

Two Mariners players currently hold Major League Baseball records. Ichiro holds the record for most single-season hits and singles, obtaining both in 2004. Mike Cameron is tied with 14 others for the most home runs in a game, with four. Additionally, Gene Walter, a Mariner for the 1988 season, is tied for the American League lead in balks for a single game, which he achieved on July 18 in a game against the Detroit Tigers.

Table key

Individual career records
Batting statistics; pitching statistics

Individual single-season recordsBatting statistics; pitching statistics;

Individual single-game records
Source:

Team season records
Source:

Team all-time records
Source:

See also
Baseball statistics
Seattle Mariners award winners and league leaders

Notes
 Cameron is one of 18 players in MLB history to hit 4 home runs in one game.
 Tied with John Dopson, Rick Honeycutt, Vic Raschi, and Bobby Witt

References

External links

Seattle Mariners
Records